The Legia Tennis Centre is a tennis complex in Warsaw, Poland. The complex was the host of the annual premier event, the Warsaw Open. The stadium court has a capacity of 4,000 people.

See also
List of tennis stadiums by capacity

External links
Official website

Gallery

Tennis venues in Poland
Sports venues in Warsaw